David Wayne Williams (February 29, 1972 – August 14, 2002) was an American vocalist best known as the original lead singer for the rock band Drowning Pool.

Biography 
He grew up in Princeton, Texas, living with his parents Charles Edward and Jo-Ann Williams. He grew up in a pious family who caused him to move away from religion. Notably, he also used to wear a T-shirt that read "Worship Satan and Smoke Crack".

In 1999, he joined Drowning Pool, who had formed in 1996 and had previously performed as an instrumental three-piece. The band released their debut album with Williams, Sinner, in 2001. Williams soon gained recognition for his performances with the band; his nickname "Stage" came from Pantera guitarist Dimebag Darrell, who gave it to him because of his known stage personality.

On August 14, 2002, Williams was found dead in the band's tour bus in Manassas, Virginia. An autopsy established that he had died from heart failure caused by hypertrophic cardiomyopathy (heart muscle disease), which went undiagnosed until his death.

A public funeral was held in Plano, Texas, on August 18, 2002, at 10:00 am. A DVD titled Sinema which chronicles his life, has since been released. His lifelong dream was to buy his parents a house; the sales from Sinner fulfilled his dream posthumously.

Williams's microphone was given to Cristian Machado from Ill Niño. They were good friends, so after his death, Drowning Pool and Williams' family gave it to Machado as a token of respect. The band Memento dedicated their set to Williams on the Ozzfest 2003 stage.

Williams was ranked in the top 100 metal vocalists of all time by Hit Parader at number 82.

The Dallas, Texas music community honored Williams and his legacy with a multi-venue music festival named "Stage Fest". Stage Fest was held in downtown Dallas' Deep Ellum district on August 14, 2007, the fifth anniversary of his death, and played in seven Deep Ellum venues including Club Dada, The Curtain Club, The Lizard Lounge, The Darkside Lounge, Red Blood Club, Reno's Chop Shop, and Tomcat's.

On August 14, 2012, the 10th anniversary of his death, Drowning Pool released the ballad "In Memory Of..." dedicated to him.

The re-released 13th anniversary of Sinner contains never before released footage of Dave Williams and his bandmates speaking about meaning of the songs on the Sinner album and more.

Footage of Williams while he was in Fugly (one of his previous bands) surfaced on the internet. It was the band Williams mentioned in the 13th anniversary Sinner release, while naming all the bands he was in before Drowning Pool.

References

External links 

Find A Grave Entry
Stage Fest Myspace page

1972 births
2002 deaths
American heavy metal singers
Drowning Pool members
Nu metal singers
20th-century American singers
Alternative metal musicians
20th-century American male singers
Deaths from cardiomyopathy